Big Floppa, or simply Floppa, is an internet meme based around a caracal named Gregory also known by the nickname Gosha. However, the name Gregory or the nickname Gosha, which is also frequently used, is less preferred as the meme community refers to the cat as "Floppa" or "Big Floppa".

Meme origin and personal life

On December 23, 2019, Instagram user prozhony posted a photograph of their pet caracal named Gosha (Гоша) lying next to their pet Maine Coon cat named Justin. The image received over 16,600 views in six months (driven largely by its meme popularity). The name "Big Floppa" originated in reference to the caracal's recognizable large tufted ears.

Gosha was born in Kyiv, Ukraine on December 21, 2017. He was adopted by Andrey Bondarev and Elena Bondareva from Moscow in April 2018. Gosha shares a room with Justin, a Maine Coon cat also owned by Andrey and Elena who is four years older than Gosha. Gosha is very active around his apartment and likes to eat shrimp and mice.

Gosha underwent surgery to remove a tumor from behind his ear in 2020, but he later made a full recovery.

Gosha and his owners were featured on the state-owned Russian television station 360 in December 2021.

Many social media platforms and services stopped operating in Russia after the 2022 Russian invasion of Ukraine began, including Instagram, where Gosha's owners usually post. In response to this, they posted a message on their profile saying, "Dear friends, Instagram will be blocked in Russia today, but we remain with you!". They also announced the creation of a YouTube channel and a Telegram channel shortly following the announcement. Gosha's owners have called out for peace and spoken out against the conflict between Russia and Ukraine. Livestreams of Gosha are broadcast on the "Big Floppa Official" YouTube channel from various webcams around Andrey and Dino's house. Gosha's channel had 20.4k subscribers as of February 2023.

Expansion and variations of memes
A general internet subculture based on caracal memes has born from the Big Floppa following.

The term "Floppa/floppas" (lowercase when used generically) has become a phrase used within this community to describe caracals with a social media presence in general, notably a caracal named Pumba from Latvia. In 2022, Gosha and Pumba met virtually via Skype. More caracal cats associated to the meme are a caracal named Adolf, also from Russia, who lives with a Serval cat called Myxa, caracal Kimbo, and caracal Gus however Gosha is the source of the “Big Floppa” meme.

Big Floppa, as a distinct title, is now typically only used to refer to Gosha, and is often compared with the nicknames of rappers as it is very similar to many rappers' scene names, with "Big Floppa" itself possibly being a reference to the 1994 Notorious B.I.G song Big Poppa.

The meme notably depicts Gosha committing war crimes and terrorist acts, which his owners have subsequently humorously addressed.

There is a flash mob in Russian Internet culture called "Мам, смотри, это Шлёпа, он тебе нравится?" (Mom, look, it's Floppa, do you like him?).

See also
 List of individual cats

References

Notes

External links

 Kittypuppy TV

2017 animal births
Animals on the Internet
Cats in popular culture
Internet memes introduced in 2019
Internet memes introduced in 2020
Individual felines
Individual animals in Russia
Internet memes introduced from Russia